The principle of univariance is how one can discriminate between wavelengths through comparison of multiple photoreceptors. The principle states that one and the same visual receptor cell can be excited by different combinations of wavelength and intensity, so that the brain cannot know the color of a certain point of the retinal image. One individual photoreceptor type can therefore not differentiate between a change in wavelength and a change in intensity. Thus the wavelength information can be extracted only by comparing the responses across different types of receptors. The principle of univariance was first described by W. A. H. Rushton (p. 4P).

Both cone monochromats (those who only have 1 cone type) and rod monochromats (those with no cones) suffer from the principle of univariance. The principle of univariance can be seen in situations where a stimulus can vary in two dimensions, but a cell's response can vary in one. For example, a colored light may vary in both wavelength and in luminance. However, the brain's cells can only vary in the rate at which action potentials are fired. Therefore, a cell tuned to red light may respond the same to a dim red light as to a bright yellow light. To avoid this, the response of multiple cells is compared.

References

Visual system